Girolamo Giovinazzo (born 10 September 1968 in Rome) is an Italian judoka who won two Olympic medals, in 1996 and 2000.

Achievements

References

External links

 
 
 

1968 births
Living people
Italian male judoka
Judoka at the 1996 Summer Olympics
Judoka at the 2000 Summer Olympics
Olympic judoka of Italy
Olympic silver medalists for Italy
Olympic bronze medalists for Italy
Olympic medalists in judo
Medalists at the 2000 Summer Olympics
Medalists at the 1996 Summer Olympics
Mediterranean Games gold medalists for Italy
Mediterranean Games medalists in judo
Competitors at the 1993 Mediterranean Games
Competitors at the 1997 Mediterranean Games
Judoka of Fiamme Gialle
20th-century Italian people
21st-century Italian people